Shaw Court is the headquarters of Shaw Communications operations in Alberta, located in Calgary.

Location
Shaw Court is located at the intersection of 3 Avenue and 6 Street SW on the north edge of downtown Calgary.

Functions
Apart from being the main operations base for Shaw's Alberta interests, Shaw Court was also home to Corus Entertainment's three Calgary radio stations: Country 105, Q107, and AM 770 CHQR.  In September 2015, these stations were moved to their current location at 3320 17th Avenue SW.

Shaw court has a 2 level underground parkade.

News
On July 10, 2012, an electrical fire wiped out radio stations, internet service, 911 service in the downtown core, cable TV service and much of city hall's phone system. Three radio stations - Country 105, AM 770 and Q 107 - were off-air.

See also
Shaw Communications
Corus Entertainment
Shaw Tower

External links
 Shaw Communications official site

Buildings and structures in Calgary